The Arrondissement of Liège is one of the four administrative arrondissements in the Walloon province of Liège, Belgium.

It is both an administrative and a judicial arrondissement. However, the Judicial Arrondissement of Liège also comprises the municipalities of Berloz, Crisnée, Donceel, Faimes, Fexhe-le-Haut-Clocher, Geer, Oreye, Remicourt and Waremme in the Arrondissement of Waremme. The municipality of Comblain-au-Pont, even though it is a part of the Administrative Arrondissement of Liège, is not a part of the Judicial Arrondissement of Liège, but of the Judicial Arrondissement of Huy.

Municipalities

The Administrative Arrondissement of Liège consists of the following municipalities:

Ans
Awans
Aywaille
Beyne-Heusay
Bassenge
Blegny
Chaudfontaine
Comblain-au-Pont

Dalhem
Esneux
Flémalle
Fléron
Grâce-Hollogne
Herstal
Juprelle
Liège

Neupré
Oupeye
Saint-Nicolas
Seraing
Soumagne
Sprimont
Trooz
Visé

References

Liège